Enneboeus caseyi is a species of cryptic fungus beetle in the family Archeocrypticidae. It is found in Central America and North America.

References

Further reading

 

Tenebrionoidea
Articles created by Qbugbot
Beetles described in 1981